Jesse Krimes (born 1982 in Lancaster, Pennsylvania) is an American artist and curator who focuses on criminal injustice and contemporary perceptions of criminality.

Life 
Krimes was raised poor without a father and used art as a way to feel safe and secure.

Career
In 2009, after graduating in Art from Millersville University, Krimes was sent to prison for cocaine possession and subsequently served five years of a six year sentence. During this time he devised a way to transfer photos from newspapers and magazines onto soap using hair gel. From this, he cut the bars into works of art and shipped them discreetly out of prison. In his last three years, he was able to gain access to art supplies and was able to produce numerous pieces and mentor others. Krimes explains that “artwork facilitated conversation. And it humanized me to some of the guards. They saw me not as an inmate but as a person.” Upon his release he co-founded Right of Return USA, a fellowship program to support previously incarcerated artists.

In 2016, JPMorgan Chase settled a lawsuit with Krimes, acting as plaintiff, for charging exorbitant fees for a debit card program that was supposed to help released inmates.

Krimes has collaborated and received public commissions with a focus on prison reform including Amnesty International, Ford Foundation, Open Philanthropy, and the City of Philadelphia Mural Arts’ Restorative Justice program, to name a few. Krimes was awarded fellowships by Robert Rauschenberg Foundation in 2017, the Independence Foundation in the same year, and the Ford Foundation’s Art For Justice initiative in 2018. Krimes is represented by Burning in Water Gallery in New York.

Krimes both appeared in and was the subject of the 2021 documentary film Art & Krimes by Krimes, directed by Alysa Nahmias.

Work Chronology

Selected chronology of showcased artwork.
 The Space Between (2006)
 Coercion (2008)
 Apokaluptein:16389067 (2014) artist
 Amnesty International Commission (2015)
 Marking Time in America: The Prison Works (2009-2013) (2016) solo show for artist
 Deus Ex Machina aka God from the Machine (2016)
 Stones, Zips, and Remnants; AP. Voices (2017)
 Portraits of Justice (2018), co-curator with Russell Craig, artist, City of Philadelphia Mural Arts Program
 Museum of Broken Windows (2018) artist
 Prison Nation (2018), artist
 The OG Experience (2019), co-curator with Russell Craig, artist
 Emanation 2019 (2019) artist
 Art as Freedom (2019) artist
 American Rendition at Malin (2020) 
 Elegy Quilts. (2021)

References

External links
 

1982 births
Artists from Philadelphia
American installation artists
Living people